APSA may refer to :

 Administration of the Patrimony of the Apostolic See, an institution of the Holy See, Vatican City
 Aerolíneas Peruanas S.A., the former national airline of Peru
 African Peace and Security Architecture, a peace and security policy framework of the African Union
 Alto Palermo S.A., an Argentine real estate company
 American Pediatric Surgical Association, an American professional association 
 American Physician Scientists Association, a professional organization 
 American Political Science Association, a professional association
 APSA Colombia, an airline based in Bogotá, Colombia
 Asia Pacific Screen Awards, an international cultural initiative of the UN, based in Australia
 London All Peoples' Sports Association football club, a non-League football team who play in the Essex Senior Football League

See also
 Appa Ali Apsa, a character from DC Comics
 G-APSA, a model of the Douglas DC-6 aircraft